Kamel Rezig (born 18 October 1964 in Boufarik) is the Algerian Minister of Trade and Export Promotion. He was appointed as minister on 7 July 2021.

Education 
Rezig holds a Graduate Diploma in Finance (1993) from the l’Institut National des Finances in Koléa, a Master in Economics (1996) and a Doctorate in Economics (2001) from the Algiers 3 University.

References

External links 
 Ministry of Trade and Export Promotion

1964 births
Living people
21st-century Algerian politicians
Algerian politicians
Government ministers of Algeria
Trade ministers of Algeria

University of Algiers alumni